Charles Ernest George Campbell Emmott (12 November 1898 – 14 April 1953) was Unionist Member of Parliament (MP) for Glasgow Springburn between the 1931 and 1935 general elections, and then a Conservative MP for East Surrey until the 1945 general election.

Educational
In his youth he attended Lancing College in Sussex, England, before moving on to Christ Church, Oxford where he was a classical scholar.   Like many of his generation, he fought in the First World War, serving in France in 1917-19 and rising to the rank of 2nd Lieutenant.   He was called to the bar (Middle Temple) in 1924.

Personal
Emmott was born on 12 November 1898, the son of Charles Emmott of Oldham by his wife, the Lady Constance Campbell, one of the many daughters of the 8th Duke of Argyll.

References

External links 

1898 births
1953 deaths
Members of the Parliament of the United Kingdom for Glasgow constituencies
Unionist Party (Scotland) MPs
UK MPs 1931–1935
Conservative Party (UK) MPs for English constituencies
UK MPs 1935–1945
Alumni of Christ Church, Oxford
Springburn
People educated at Lancing College